Shiv Sena (Uddhav Balasaheb Thackeray) is a secular hindutva-based, Marathi regionalist, nationalist political party formed in 2022 under the leadership of former Chief Minister of Maharashtra, Uddhav Thackeray. 

It was allotted a new symbol by the Election Commission, separate from the main Shiv Sena. It was one of two separate factions, the other being the Balasahebanchi Shiv Sena, led by Eknath Shinde, formed as a result of the 2022 Maharashtra political crisis, until the Election Commission recognised the faction led by Eknath Shinde as the legitimate structure of Shiv Sena in February 2023. Thackeray filed petition against the decision of the ECI at the Supreme Court in New Delhi.

Formation
The party was formed after a split in Shiv Sena as a result of the 2022 Maharashtra political crisis. The split was caused by a rebellion by Eknath Shinde, who staged a rebellion in the party, getting support of the majority of the MLAs of the Sena and later splitting from the group led by Uddhav Thackeray, forming the Maharashtra government with the Bharatiya Janata Party, in which Shinde got the post of chief minister whereas the BJP's Devendra Fadnavis became deputy chief minister. The two factions in the Sena later formed separate political parties, with the secular and progressive group, seeking to move further to the left, led by Uddhav Thackeray forming Shiv Sena (Uddhav Balasaheb Thackeray) whereas the traditional and original Hindu nationalist faction of the Shiv Sena led by Eknath Shinde formed the Balasahebanchi Shiv Sena.

ECI decision
On 17 February 2023, Election Commission of India recognised Eknath Shinde's faction as representing Shiv Sena officially. Shiv Sena (Uddhav Balasaheb Thackeray) leader Uddhav Thackeray has filed an appeal with the Supreme Court of India. Further, in its decision, the ECI allowed the party to keep its torch symbol until state assembly by polls.

Leaders

List of Rajya Sabha members

Electoral performance
In the 2022 Maharashtra gram panchayat polls, the MVA won 457 gram panchayat seats, out of which the NCP got 155 seats, while the SS (UBT) got 153 seats and the Congress got 149 seats. The NDA got 352 seats, out of which the BJP won 239 seats and the BSS won 113 seats.

References 

2022 establishments in Maharashtra
Political parties in India
Political parties established in 2022
Shiv Sena
Conservative parties in India